Augusto Samuel Boyd Briceño (1 August 1879 in Panama City – 17 June 1957) was a politician from Panama.

Background 
He was elected as the first presidential designate by the National Assembly for the terms 1936–1938 and 1938–1940. In that capacity he became President of Panama when Juan Demóstenes Arosemena died in December 1939. He served until 1 October 1940.

During his government, the Transisthmian Highway, a highway that crossed the Isthmus of Panama and linked Panama City with Colón, was inaugurated. This road was known as the "Boyd-Roosevelt Highway" in honor of the Presidents of Panama and the United States.

He belonged to the National Revolutionary Party (PNR).

References

1879 births
1957 deaths
Presidents of Panama
Vice presidents of Panama
People from Panama City
Panameñista Party politicians
Children of national leaders